Rodeo Street may refer to:

 Rodeo Drive
 Munjeong-dong Rodeo Street
 Apgujeong Rodeo Street
 Apgujeongrodeo Station